The Myths Op. 30 is a work for violin and piano written by Karol Szymanowski in 1915 and premiered one year later by Paweł Kochański on violin and the composer on piano. It is dedicated to Kochański's wife, Zofia Kochańska.

Similarly to the Métopes composed around the same time, the Myths consists of three programmatic miniature tone poems drawing on Greek mythology. The piece was heavily inspired by the composer's earlier travels in Sicily and North Africa and by impressionist music.

The work is considered an important milestone in 20th-century violin writing and was heavily admired by Szymanowski's contemporaries, such as Béla Bartók and Sergei Prokofiev. It features heavy use of advanced violin techniques, and the third movement famously contains quarter tones.

Performance usually lasts about twenty minutes.

Structure 
The piece has three movements, each depicting a scene from Greek mythology:
La fontaine d'Arethuse (The Fountain of Arethusa)
Narcisse (Narcissus)
Dryades et Pan (Dryads and Pan)

References

External links
 
 Rice University: Karol Szymanowski's Musical Language in "Myths" for violin and piano, op. 30 by Hyojin Ahn, thesis submission, May 2008

Compositions by Karol Szymanowski
Suites (music)
1915 compositions
Music dedicated to family or friends
Compositions for violin and piano